Peninver (pronounced "Pe-NEE-ver") is a small village situated on the east coast of Kintyre, Scotland.
The village is located on Ardnacross Bay, with an outlook over the bay to the Isle of Arran.

Villages in Kintyre